Lamia is a daemon in Greek mythology.

Lamia may also refer to:

Mythology
 Lamia (daughter of Poseidon), who was the mother, by Zeus, of the Libyan Sibyl
 Lamia, another name for Sybaris, a legendary man-eating female beast near Delphi
 Lamia (Basque mythology), a Basque mythological female creature
 Lamia, type of slavic dragon in Bulgarian folklore

Animals
 Lamia (animal), a mouse-like animal in New Guinea
 Lamia (genus), a genus of longhorn beetles

Film and television
 Lamia (Stardust), the main antagonist in the 2007 fantasy film Stardust played by Michelle Pfeiffer
 A character from the television series Neverwhere
 A character from the television series Betterman
 A character from the 1984 Polish movie Sexmission
 The demon haunting the main character in the 2009 movie Drag Me To Hell
 A character from the puppet series X-Bomber (renamed to Star Fleet when dubbed for the UK)

Literature
 "Lamia" (poem), a poem by John Keats
 Lamia, play by Euripides
 Lamia, dramatic romance by Thomas Hood
 Characters who are born as vampires in L. J. Smith's Night World books
 Lamia a work by the Italian humanist Angelo Poliziano, consisting of an opening oration, in which he offers a fable-tinted history of philosophy
 A race of vampire-like creatures in the Tim Powers novel The Stress of Her Regard
 Lamia, a family of characters in the Hyperion Cantos by Dan Simmons
 The spirit of an ancient sword in the Korean manhwa Id
 The mother of the main female vampire in Whitley Strieber's novel The Hunger

Music
 "The Lamia", a song on the Genesis album The Lamb Lies Down on Broadway
"Lamia", a song by on the Yamantaka // Sonic Titan album UZU
 "Lamia", a song by Lord Belial from Enter the Moonlight Gate
 "Lamia", a song by Nana Kitade from her 13th single "Punk&Baby's"
 Lamia, work for soprano voice and orchestra by American composer Jacob Druckman
 Lamia, orchestral work by American composer Edward MacDowell
 Lamia, symphonic poem by English composer Dorothy Howell

People
 Lamia (given name), a feminine name of Greek, Arabic, Bulgarian, Basque origin
 Lamia of Athens (fl. 300 BC), courtesan
 Lucius Aelius Lamia (died 43 BC), activist during the civic strife at the end of the Roman Republic.
 Lucius Aelius Lamia (consul 3) (before 43 BCE – 33 CE), Roman consul
 Lucius Aelius Lamia Plautius Aelianus (c. 45 - 81/96), Roman consul in the year 80
 Lucius Fundanius Lamia Aelianus (ca 83 - 132/136), Roman consul in 116 and proconsul in 131-132
 Lucius Plautius Lamia Silvanus (fl. 110–145), Roman consul in 145
Lamia al-Hariri, Syrian diplomat
Ercole Lamia (died 1591), Italian Roman Catholic bishop of Alessano  
Georges Lamia (1933–2014), French former football goalkeeper
Jenna Lamia, American actress, writer, and award-winning audio book narrator

Places
 Lamia (city), a city in Greece
 Lamia River, a river in Uganda

Other uses
 LaMia, a Venezuelan-Bolivian airline
 Lamia F.C., a football club based in Lamia, Greece

Turkish feminine given names